Alfonso Blanco may refer to:

Alfonso Blanco Antúnez (born 1987), Mexican footballer
Alfonso Blanco (boxer) (born 1986), Venezuelan boxer